ISO/IEC JTC 1/SC 36 Information Technology for Learning, Education and Training is a standardization subcommittee (SC), which is part of the Joint Technical Committee ISO/IEC JTC 1 of the International Organization for Standardization (ISO) and the International Electrotechnical Commission (IEC), that develops and facilitates standards within the field of information technology (IT) for learning, education and training (LET). ISO/IEC JTC 1/SC 36 was established at the November 1999 ISO/IEC JTC 1 plenary in Seoul, Korea. The subcommittee held its first plenary meeting in March 2000 in London, United Kingdom. The international secretariat of ISO/IEC JTC 1/SC 36 is the Korean Agency for Technology and Standards (KATS), located in the Republic of Korea.

Scope
The scope of ISO/IEC JTC 1/SC 36 is "Standardization in the field of information technologies for learning, education, and training (ITLET) to support individuals, groups, or organizations, and to enable interoperability and reusability of resources and tools".

Structure
ISO/IEC JTC 1/SC 36 is made up of 5 Working Groups (WGs), 3 Advisory Groups (AG) and 1 Ad-Hoc Group(AHG). Each Working Group carries out specific tasks in standards development within the field of ITLET, where the focus of each working group is described in the group’s terms of reference. The Working Groups of ISO/IEC JTC 1/SC 36 are:

Collaborations
ISO/IEC JTC 1/SC 36 works in close collaboration with a number of other organizations or subcommittees, both internal and external to ISO or IEC, in order to avoid conflicting or duplicative work.

Organizations internal to ISO or IEC that collaborate with or are in liaison to ISO/IEC JTC 1/SC 36 include:
 ISO/IEC JTC 1/SC 17, Cards and personal identification
 ISO/IEC JTC 1/SC 27, IT Security techniques
 ISO/IEC JTC 1/SC 32, Data management and interchange
 ISO/IEC JTC 1/SC 34, Document description and processing languages
 ISO/IEC JTC 1/SC 35, User interfaces
 ISO/IEC JTC 1/SC 39, Sustainability for and by information technology
 ISO/TC 37, Terminology and other language and content resources
 ISO/TC 46, Information and documentation
 ISO/TC 176, Quality management and quality assurance
 ISO/TC 215, Health informatics
 ISO/TC 232, Learning services outside formal education
 ISO/PC 288, Educational organizations management systems – Requirements with guidance for use
 ISO/PC 288/WG1, Educational organizations management systems

Organizations external to ISO or IEC that collaborate with, or are in liaison to, ISO/IEC JTC 1/SC 36 include:

<Current in 2022>

 Agence universitaire de la Francophonie (AUF)
 International Information Centre for Terminology(Infoterm)
 IEEE LTSC, Learning Technology Standards Committee
 1EdTech, 1EdTech Consortium

<Past>
 Advanced Distributed Learning (ADL)
 Aviation Industry Computer-Based Training Committee (AICC)
 Cartago Alliance
 CEN TC 353, Information and Communication Technologies for Learning, Education and Training
 Dublin Core Metadata Initiative (DCMI)
 IMS Global Learning Consortium
 International Federation for Learning, Education, and Training Systems Interoperability (LETSI)
 International Digital Publishing Forum (IDPF)
 W3C:Indie UI, W3C Web Accessibility Independent User Interface
 Schema.org

Member countries
Countries pay a fee to ISO to be members of subcommittees.

The 22 "P" (participating) members of ISO/IEC JTC 1/SC 36 are: Australia (SA), Canada (SCC), China (SAC), Finland (SFS), France (AFNOR), Germany (DIN), India (BIS), Iran, Islamic Republic of (INSO), Italy (UNI), Japan (JISC), Kazakhstan(KAZMEST), Republic of Korea (KATS), Netherlands (NEN), Norway (SN), Philippines(BPS), Portugal (IPQ), Rwanda (RSB), Russian Federation (GOST R), Slovakia (SOSMT), South Africa (SABS), Spain (UNE), Ukraine (DSTU), United Kingdom (BSI).

The 26 "O" (observer) members of ISO/IEC JTC 1/SC 36 are: Algeria (IANOR), Argentina (IRAM), Austria (ASI), Belgium (NBN), Bosnia and Herzegovina (BAS), Colombia (ICONTEC), Czech Republic (UNMZ), Ethiopia(ESA), Ghana (GSA), Greece(NQIS ELOT), Hong Kong (ITCHKSAR), Hungary (MSZT), Indonesia (BSN), Ireland (NSAI), Kenya (KEBS), New Zealand (SNZ), Pakistan (PSQCA), Romania (ASRO), Saudi Arabia (SASO), Serbia (ISS), Sweden (SIS), Switzerland (SNV), Tunisia (INNORPI), Turkey (TSE). Uganda (UNBS) 

※ Note: Name of Country(Name of National Body)

Published standards
As of 2022, ISO/IEC JTC 1/SC 36 has 55 published standards within the field of Information technology for learning, education and training, including:

See also
 ISO/IEC JTC 1
 List of ISO standards
 Korean Agency for Technology and Standards
 International Organization for Standardization
 International Electrotechnical Commission

References

External links 
 ISO/IEC JTC 1/SC 36 page at ISO

036